Kriegel is a surname. Notable people with the surname include:
Ana Kriégel, (2004–2018), Russian-Irish murder victim.
Annie Kriegel (1926–1995), French historian
František Kriegel (1908–1979), Czechoslovak politician and physician
Hans-Peter Kriegel (born 1948), German computer scientist 
Leonard Kriegel (born 1933), American author
Mark Kriegel, American author, journalist, and television commentator
Maurice Kriegel-Valrimont (1914–2006), French politician
Volker Kriegel (1943–2003), German jazz guitarist